Arthrostylidae is an extinct family of bryozoans of the order Cryptostomida. Their colonies commonly possess articulated joints which provide flexibility.

Genera 
Arthrostylidae includes the following genera:

References

Bryozoan families
Stenolaemata
Prehistoric bryozoans